Daniils Ulimbaševs (born 12 March 1992) is a Latvian footballer who plays as a midfielder for Latvian Higher League club, FK Auda.

Career
On 2021, Ulimbaševs joined to Latvian Higher League club, FK Auda. On 20 october 2022, Ulimbaševs scored a goal in the 42nd minute of the 2022 Latvian Football Cup final and he brought his club to the 2022 Latvian Football Cup for the first time in history after beating FK RFS with a narrow score of 1–0.

International
He made his debut for the Latvia national football team on 10 October 2017 in a World Cup qualifier group game against Andorra.

Honours
 FK Auda
 Latvian Cup : 2022

References

External links
 
 

1992 births
Living people
Latvian footballers
Latvia under-21 international footballers
Latvia international footballers
Latvian people of Russian descent
AFC Eskilstuna players
Latvian expatriate footballers
Expatriate footballers in Sweden
Ettan Fotboll players
FK Spartaks Jūrmala players
Latvian Higher League players
FC Jūrmala players
FK Ventspils players
FK RFS players
FK Jelgava players
FK Liepāja players
FK Auda players
Association football midfielders
Ilūkstes NSS players